Batrachedrodes ephelus is a moth of the family Momphidae. It was first described by Lord Walsingham in 1907 and is endemic to the Hawaiian island of Molokai.

The larvae probably feed on a fern species.

References

External links

Momphidae
Endemic moths of Hawaii
Moths described in 1907
Biota of Molokai